Le Creuset (meaning "the crucible") is a French maker of cookware. They are best known for producing enameled cast-iron cookware. The company first manufactured their products in the town of Fresnoy-le-Grand in France in 1925, which are similar in function to a Dutch oven but with T-shaped handles designed by the Italian industrial innovator Enzo Mari. The Le Creuset Dutch oven is on display in the Smithsonian Institution's National Museum of American History in Washington, D.C. as a part of the recreation of the chef Julia Child's kitchen.  It has been widely reported to be her favorite cooking pot, though specialist sources hold that it was the Dutch oven of Le Creuset's less-remembered competitor Descoware that was her real favorite.  The company also makes many other types of cookware and bakeware, from fondue-sets to tagines.

History
Le Creuset was founded in Fresnoy-le-Grand, Aisne, Picardy at the crossroads of transportation routes for iron, coke, and sand. Armand De Saegher (a Belgian casting specialist) and Octave Aubecq (a Belgian enamelling specialist) opened the foundry in 1925.  That same year, the first cocotte (or French oven) was produced, laying the foundation for what is now an extensive range of cookware and kitchen utensils. Flame (orange), was used for the first piece.

During World War II, Le Creuset began to focus on continually improving cast iron. 

In the 1950s the designer Raymond Loewy introduced a futuristic type of cookware.

In 1957, Le Creuset purchased a competitor, Les Hauts Fourneaux de Cousances, and began producing items such as a grill and a fondue set.

The cookery writer Elizabeth David promoted Mediterranean cooking in the UK and was a Le Creuset promoter, particularly in her 1969 booklet 'Cooking with Le Creuset'. One of the colours of blue in the cookware range was created for her 

The current Le Creuset logo was introduced in 1970 as a symbolic representation of metal casting and moulding.

In the 1970s Enzo Mari designed distinctive Dutch ovens and saucepans with domed lids and typical handles. In the 1980s JC Barrault's "Futura" line was launched.

The company was purchased by Paul van Zuydam in 1988.

In 1995, Le Creuset began exploring new product categories: stainless steel, stoneware, silicone, enamel on steel, textiles and forged hard-anodized aluminium.

Le Creuset offers a variety of colours, from bright (e.g. cherry, a gradated red) to muted (e.g. dune, a gradated off-white).  Its discontinued colours include cobalt (gradated blue-violet), black onyx (solid black), kiwi (gradated light green), as well as slate, granite, cactus, and citron. In addition to their standard colors, Le Creuset partners with major kitchenware retail brands such as Williams-Sonoma and Sur La Table to offer unique "exclusive" colors which are only available for purchase through their respective stores.

Le Creuset kitchenware gained new fans amongst users of social media in 2020 as a high value designer brand.

Production
To manufacture their cast-iron cookware, the Le Creuset foundry uses standard sand casting methods. After hand finishing, items are sprayed with at least two coats of enamel. The Le Creuset Signature range of cast iron cookware is coated in a minimum of three coats of enamel. The enamel becomes resistant to damage during normal use. Currently, all Le Creuset cast-iron cookware is still manufactured in the company's foundry in Fresnoy-le-Grand. The process was  featured on BBC Two's Inside the Factory.

Le Creuset products that are not cast-iron may be made in other countries, such as China (accessories or silicone products), Thailand (kettles and ceramics), England (enamel cleaner),  Portugal (stainless steel), and Swaziland (clay pots).

See also
Cousances
Descoware
Druware

Image gallery

References

External links

 

French companies established in 1925
Kitchenware brands
Manufacturing companies established in 1925
Manufacturing companies of France
Vitreous enamel